German submarine U-318 was a Type VIIC/41 U-boat of Nazi Germany's Kriegsmarine during World War II.

The submarine was laid down on 14 October 1942 by the Flender Werke yard at Lübeck as yard number 318, launched on 25 September 1943, and commissioned on 13 November under the command of Oberleutnant zur See Josef Will.

She served with the 4th U-boat Flotilla for training, the 11th U-boat Flotilla from 1 August 1943 to 4 November 1944, the 13th flotilla from 5 November 1944 to 28 February 1945 and the 14th flotilla from 1 March to 8 May 1945 for operations.

She completed six patrols, but did not sink any ships.

She was a member of two wolfpacks.

The boat surrendered at Narvik in Norway on 9 May 1945. She was sunk on 21 December 1945 as part of Operation Deadlight.

Design
German Type VIIC/41 submarines were preceded by the heavier Type VIIC submarines. U-318 had a displacement of  when at the surface and  while submerged. She had two shafts and two  propellers.

U-318 was fitted with five  torpedo tubes (four fitted at the bow and one at the stern), fourteen torpedoes, one  SK C/35 naval gun, (220 rounds), one  Flak M42 and two  C/30 anti-aircraft guns. The boat had a complement of between forty-four and sixty.

Service history

Her patrols used a variety of bases in Norway: e.g. Egersund, Bergen, Kristiansand, Arendal, Trondheim, Bogenbucht, Kilbotn, Harstad and Narvik, but none of them was longer than 32 days.

Fate
At the end of World War II, she surrendered at Narvik on 10 May 1945. She was moved to Skjomenfjord, then Loch Eriboll in Scotland, arriving there on 19 May. She was moved again to Loch Ryan for Operation Deadlight and sunk on 21 December north of Northern Ireland.

See also
 Battle of the Atlantic (1939-1945)

References

Bibliography

External links

German Type VIIC/41 submarines
U-boats commissioned in 1943
1943 ships
World War II submarines of Germany
Ships built in Lübeck
U-boats sunk by Polish warships
Operation Deadlight
U-boats sunk in 1945
Maritime incidents in December 1945